Kevin Michael Richardson (born October 25, 1964) is an American actor. Known for his distinctively deep voice, he has mostly voiced villainous characters in animation and video games. In film, Richardson voiced Goro in Mortal Kombat (1995) and reprises in Mortal Kombat Legends: Scorpion's Revenge (2020), Captain Gantu in the Lilo & Stitch franchise, and Deus Ex Machina in The Matrix Revolutions (2003). He has also voiced characters on Seth MacFarlane's shows Family Guy, The Cleveland Show, and American Dad!, as well as several characters on The Simpsons.

Richardson is also known for his roles as Trigon, Mammoth & See-More in both Teen Titans and Teen Titans Go!, Antauri in Super Robot Monkey Team Hyperforce Go!, the Shredder in Teenage Mutant Ninja Turtles (2012), Stump Smash and Tree Rex in the Skylanders video game series, as the second voice of Dr. Hibbert and various others in The Simpsons, Rosie in F Is for Family, Barney Rubble in The Flintstones: On the Rocks, and the Mauler Twins and Monster Girl in Invincible. He received two Daytime Emmy Award nominations for voicing the Joker in The Batman (2004–2008).

Early life 
Richardson was born on October 25, 1964 in the Bronx borough of New York City. He earned a BFA in theater from Syracuse University in 1988.

Career 

Richardson began his live-action acting career in New York City, where he performed in commercials. His first professional acting job was in an AT&T commercial. He was frequently hired as a voice for television commercials. He later moved to Los Angeles. He has usually portrayed villainous characters due to his deep and powerful voice. In 1995, he obtained his first voice role as Mayor Tilton on the animated television version of The Mask. Additionally, early in his career, he appeared in a PBS special directed by John Houseman.

Richardson's other credits include Captain Gantu in Lilo & Stitch and its franchise, Shnitzel in the Chowder pilot (and was later replaced by John DiMaggio), Goro in Mortal Kombat, the second voice of Skulker on Danny Phantom, Sarevok in the Baldur's Gate series, Jolee Bindo in Star Wars: Knights of the Old Republic, Crunch Bandicoot in the Crash Bandicoot games, Sai Sahan in Elder Scrolls Online MMORPG series, Tartarus from Halo 2, Chairman Drek in Ratchet & Clank, Antauri in Super Robot Monkey Team Hyperforce Go!, Openly Gator from Queer Duck, Doctor Payne and others on The Proud Family, Dark Laser on The Fairly OddParents, Maurice from The Penguins of Madagascar (replacing Cedric the Entertainer), Slam Tasmanian and Tech E. Coyote on Loonatics Unleashed and the voice of Exile in the 1990s animated series Road Rovers.

Richardson replaced Keith David as the voice of Tombstone on The Spectacular Spider-Man. He provided a character voice set for Icewind Dale: Heart of Winter and Icewind Dale II. He was the voice of Heihachi in the PlayStation 2 game Soul Calibur II, though he is listed in the role as Victor Stone. He also voiced Stump Smash and Tree Rex in Skylanders: Swap Force, Skylanders: Trap Team and Skylanders: SuperChargers.

In 2001, Richardson voiced Barney Rubble in the animated movie The Flintstones: On the Rocks. In 2004, he became the first Black actor to portray the Joker, voicing the character on the animated series The Batman, a role for which he was twice nominated for the Daytime Emmy Award for Outstanding Performer in an Animated Program. In 2005, he voiced Trigon on the animated series Teen Titans, taking over the role from Keith Szarabajka.

In 2006, he appeared in the comedy Clerks II in which he plays a cop who notices the words "Porch Monkey 4 Life" written on the back of Randal Graves' work jacket; he also voiced the elder dragon Terrador from The Legend of Spyro game series. In 2008, he performed the voice of Bishop for Wolverine and the X-Men. Later, he did the voice of Nick Fury on The Super Hero Squad Show. He also voiced Tyro in Nickelodeon's Avatar: The Last Airbender in 2004.

Richardson often plays characters based on comedian Bill Cosby, such as on Family Guy ("Brian Does Hollywood"), where Stewie is a contestant on the comedian's Kids Say the Darndest Things; as Cosby himself on The Boondocks; and Numbuh 5's father Mr. Lincoln, an homage to Cosby on Codename: Kids Next Door.

His most frequent role on Family Guy is Jerome, Lois's ex-boyfriend. He also is the voice of Cleveland Brown Jr. and voiced Lester Krinklesac and numerous others on The Cleveland Show. He currently voices Principal Brian Lewis on American Dad! and is the current voice for Dr. Hibbert replacing Harry Shearer on The Simpsons. His voice roles in 2011 included Panthro in the Thundercats series, Martian Manhunter on Young Justice and Bulkhead, one of the Autobots in Transformers: Prime. He played Kilowog in Green Lantern: Rise of the Manhunters, the video game sequel to the live-action film Green Lantern and later reprised the role in Green Lantern: The Animated Series.

He was nominated for Voice Actor of the Year by Behind the Voice Actors in 2012 and in 2013.

In September 2013, he provided the voice of Mr. Gus on the Cartoon Network show Uncle Grandpa. In 2015, he did the voice of a Nigerian king on The Simpsons episode "The Princess Guide". Later, he provided the voice of Judge Michaels in Tyler Perry's first animated film, Madea's Tough Love. In 2021, he provided the voice of Jimbo in The Boss Baby: Back in Business (2018), the sequel to the 2017 film The Boss Baby.

Personal life 
Richardson lives in Los Angeles with his wife, Monica, whom he married in 2006. He is the stepfather of her two sons from a previous marriage.

Filmography

Film

Television

Animated film

Direct-to-video and television films

Animation

Video games

Web

References

Bibliography

External links 

www.kevinmichaelrichardson.net (archived)

Richardson on 'Cuse Conversations Podcast in 2021

1964 births
Living people
20th-century African-American people
20th-century American male actors
21st-century African-American people
21st-century American male actors
African-American male actors
American male film actors
American male television actors
American male video game actors
American male voice actors
American people of Jamaican descent
Audiobook narrators
Cartoon Network people
Disney people
Male actors from Los Angeles
Male actors from New York City
People from the Bronx
Syracuse University College of Visual and Performing Arts alumni